Dong may refer to:
 Dong language (China), a Kra–Dai language of China
 Dong language (Nigeria), a Niger–Congo language of Nigeria